This is the complete list of Olympic medalists in karate, which was first contested at the 2020 Summer Olympics in Tokyo.

Men

Kata

Kumite -67 kg

Kumite -75 kg

Kumite +75 kg

Women

Kata

Kumite -55 kg

Kumite -61 kg

Kumite +61 kg

Statistics

All-time medal table

Source:

References

External links
 Results book 

Karate at the Summer Olympics
Olympic medalists in karate
Karate